Michael Ian Yeabsley (born 1972) is an English former first-class cricketer.

Son of former Devon player, Doug Yeabsley, and brother of fellow first-class player Richard, Yeabsley was educated at Haberdashers' Aske's Boys' School and Queens' College, Cambridge. During his brief cricket career, he was an off-break bowler. He represented Cambridge University, playing just two first-class matches (both in 1995), taking two wickets at a cost of 42 runs each. After university, he became a Geography teacher, teaching at Haberdashers' for 11 years, before becoming Head of Geography and, initially, Master in Charge of Cricket at Aldenham School in 2008. A House Master, Yeabsley lives in the school with his wife and seven children.

References

External links

1972 births
Living people
Alumni of Queens' College, Cambridge
Cambridge University cricketers
Cricketers from St Albans
English cricketers
Geography teachers
People educated at Haberdashers' Boys' School